"Young Lovers" is a song written by Ray Hildebrand and Jill Jackson, and performed by Paul & Paula. It was the follow-up to their number-one hit, "Hey Paula".

Chart performance
The song reached number six on the Billboard Pop Singles chart in 1963, as well as number fourteen on the Hot R&B Singles chart.

References

1963 singles
Philips Records singles
Male–female vocal duets
1963 songs